

The Maison pompéienne ("Pompeian house"), sometimes called the Palais pompéien ("Pompeian palace") was the hôtel particulier of Prince Jérôme Napoléon in Paris in the style of the Villa of Diomedes in Pompeii. It was located at 16-18 Avenue Montaigne from 1860 to 1891.

It was built in 1856–1860 on the former site of the Pavillon des Beaux-Arts of the Exposition Universelle of 1855. As president of the Exposition, Jérôme had bought the land for it. The architects included Jacques-Ignace Hittorff, Auguste Rougévin, and finally Alfred-Nicolas Normand. Camille-Auguste Gastine created the decorative schemes in Pompeian style. Its interior paintings included works by Sébastien Cournu and Jean-Léon Gérôme. It is considered a good example of Neo-Grec style.

When Jérôme went into exile, he sold it to investors, who opened it to the public during the Exposition Universelle of 1867. It was abandoned during the Siege of 1871 and was in poor condition by 1889. It was demolished in 1891, and the Hôtel Porgès built on the site.

See also

 Villa Kerylos

References

Bibliography
 Théophile Gautier, Le Palais pompéien de l'avenue Montaigne: étude sur la maison gréco-romaine, 1866, full text

External links
 Photos at the Agence photo de la Réunion des Musées nationaux et du Grand Palais

Replica buildings
Former buildings and structures in Paris
Hôtels particuliers in Paris
Buildings and structures completed in 1860
Buildings and structures demolished in 1891
Greek Revival houses